Jolly Bastian is a Stunt Master predominantly working with South Indian film industry. His portfolio done 900 films includes movies like Putnanja, Annayya, Nattukku Oru Nallavan, Bangalore Days, Crazy Star, Super Ranga, Shyloo, Aramane, Gaalipata, Silence, Overtake (2017), Operation Java (2021) and Oru Cinemakkaran (2017) Salaga, Popcorn-monkey-tiger .etc. Director for Kannada movie "Ninagagi Kadiruve", on going project"lockdown". He also runs an event management and orchestra group named 24 Events in which he is also the lead singer.

Early life and background

Jolly was born on 24 September 1966 in Alleppey, but was brought up in Bengaluru. He studied in St Patrick's, Bangalore. Both, his dad and granddad were mechanic technicians.

First break and growth

He too started off as a mechanic and once while doing his passionate wheelie on his bike, a filmmaker noticed him and introduced him the Kannada film industry as a stuntman..
His first project was to be the dupe for Ravichandran in Premaloka. Jolly was just 17 years old then. Till 1994, he was involved in small stunts and then he got his dream break as the action director in Ravinchandran's  Putnanja, which went on to become a super hit.

He was also the chief of Karnataka Stunt Directors and Professionals Association.

Professional risks

Jolly has had his share of accidents in his profession. While he is well known for his bike and car stunts in Sandalwood, a bomb blast scene in Bhale Chatura broke his collar bone and two ribs. A bike fall in Putnanja damaged his face and knees. He says, "As a stunt man, the profession itself is risky. Today there is new equipment to help us. Ropes and harness equipment have made jumps and other stunts safe to a large extent. Fireproof clothes have made working in scenes involving fire safe."

Directorial stint
He also tried his luck as a director with Ninagaagi Kaadiruve, which did not fare well. In an interview, he said, "My directorial venture- Ninagagi Kaadiruve, a romantic thriller, wasn’t a bad movie. I had to suffer a lot due to a wrong partner. It was a tough phase in my life. I am doing another movie shortly, which is in the writing phase. Another original story like my debut work. I’ll continue to make original movies instead of remakes. I want to show that creativity can mint money and not pose financial loss to a producer. I want to break that barrier!"

Singer
Jolly has an orchestra group '24 Events' in which he is the lead singer. He also sings on occasions.

Filmography

 Premaloka (Kannada)
 Putnanja (Kannada)
 Annayya (Telugu)
 Butterflies (Malayalam)
 Dum (Tamil)
 Nattukku Oru Nallavan (Tamil)
Ayalum Njanum Thammil (Malayalam)
 Bangalore Days (Malayalam)
 Crazy Star (Kannada)
 Super Ranga (Kannada)
 Shyloo (Kannada)
 Aramane (Kannada)
 Gaalipata (Kannada)
 Nakshatram (Telugu)
 Popcorn Monkey Tiger (Kannada)
 Operation Java (Malayalam)
 Oru Kuttanadan Blog (Malayalam)
 Angamaly Diaries (Malayalam)
 Kammattipadam (Malayalam)
 Kali (Malayalam)
 Erida (Malayalam-Tamil)
 Masterpiece (Kannada)
 Masterpiece (Malayalam)
 Highway (Malayalam)
 Johnnie Walker (Malayalam)
 Love (Kannada)
 Vamshi (Kannada)
 The Body (Hindi)
 Darwaza Bandh Rakho (Hindi)
 Bailaras (Punjabi)
 Chachi 420 (Punjabi)

References

1966 births
Living people
Indian stunt performers
Male actors from Alappuzha
Male actors from Bangalore
Male actors in Kannada cinema
Male actors in Telugu cinema
Male actors in Tamil cinema
Male actors in Malayalam cinema
20th-century Indian male actors